The Spacecraft Propulsion Research Facility, now known as the In-Space Propulsion Facility, is (according to NASA), the "world’s only facility capable of testing full-scale upper-stage launch vehicles and rocket engines under simulated high-altitude conditions."  The facility, located at NASA's Plum Brook Station of the Glenn Research Center near Sandusky, Ohio, was built in 1968.  Its first major use was for testing stages of the Centaur Rocket, which was used to launch some of America's most important space probes.  The facility was designated a National Historic Landmark in 1985.

Description and history
This remote site was established by NASA to facilitate large-scale testing of dangerous equipment. The In-Space Propulsion Facility, designed to perform full-scale test-firing of large rockets, is one of several facilities at the station. It consists of a building housing its main test chamber, a test equipment building, and fueling and exhaust facilities associated with the firing of rockets within the test chamber. Engines in the test chamber can generate a thrust up to 400,000 pounds.

The facility was built in 1968 as part of the Centaur development.  These upper-stage rockets (launched on Atlas V first stages) needed to be capable of firing at high altitude to launch their payloads out of Earth orbit.  More than ten tests of Centaur rockets here enabled the later successful launches in the Pioneer, Voyager, and Viking programs.

See also
National Register of Historic Places listings in Erie County, Ohio
List of National Historic Landmarks in Ohio
Zero Gravity Research Facility, also at Plum Brook Station

References

External links
National Historic Landmark listing

 Man in Space Theme Study
 In-Space Propulsion Facility

National Register of Historic Places in Erie County, Ohio
National Historic Landmarks in Ohio
Government buildings completed in 1968
Buildings and structures in Erie County, Ohio
Glenn Research Center